Haringhata Assembly constituency is an assembly constituency in Nadia district in the Indian state of West Bengal. It is reserved for scheduled castes.

Overview
As per orders of the Delimitation Commission, No. 93 Haringhata Assembly constituency (SC) is composed of the following: Haringhata municipality, Haringhata community development block, and Dewli and Hingara gram panchayats of Chakdaha community development block.

Haringhata Assembly constituency (SC) is part of No. 14 Bangaon (Lok Sabha constituency) (SC). It was earlier part of the Nabadwip (Lok Sabha constituency).

Members of Legislative Assembly

Election results

2021

2011
In the 2011 election, Nilima Nag (Mallick) of Trinamool Congress defeated her nearest rival Dr. Biswajit Paul of CPI(M).

 

.# Swing calculated on Congress+Trinamool Congress vote percentages taken together in 2006.

2006
In the 2006 election, Bankim Chandra Ghosh of CPIM won the seat.

1977-2006
In the 2006 and 2001 state assembly elections, Bankim Chandra Ghosh of CPI (M) won the Haringhata assembly seat, defeating his nearest rivals Dipak Basu and Saradindu Biswas (both of Trinamool Congress) in the respective years.  Contests in most years were multi cornered but only winners and runners are being mentioned. In 1996, Mili Hira of CPI (M) defeated Ratna Ghosh of Congress.  In 1991, 1987, 1982 and 1977 Nani Gopal Malakar of CPI (M) defeated Pratap Roy of Congress, Dilip Roy of Congress, Phani Bhusan Das of ICS and Manas Kumar Ganguly of Congress in the respective years.

1957-1972
Sakti Kumar Bhattacharya of CPI won in 1972. Nani Gopal Malakar of CPI won in 1971. Mohammad Karim Baksh, Independent, won in 1969 and 1967. Narendra Nath Sarkar of Congress won in 1962. In 1957 Haringhata was a joint seat with one seat reserved for SC. Smarajit Bandopadhyay and Promatha Ranjan Thakur, both of Congress, won in 1957. The Haringhata seat was not there in 1951.

References

Assembly constituencies of West Bengal
Politics of Nadia district